The following is a list of episodes for the Fox sitcom The Bernie Mac Show. The show ran for five seasons from 2001 to 2006 with 104 episodes produced.

Series overview

Episodes

Season 1 (2001–02)

Season 2 (2002–03)

Season 3 (2003–04)

Season 4 (2004–05)

Season 5 (2005–06)

References

Lists of American sitcom episodes